Chor: The Bicycle is an assamese language drama film directed by Khanjan Kishore Nath and produced by Sanjive Narain under his banner AM Television and associated with Ramdhenu films and White Flower.

Reception

Chor: The Bicycle has already been selected for Goa Film Bazaar organized by the International Film Festival of India 2011 and was also invited to the Producer Lab, Cinemart, organised by the International Film Festival of Rotterdam 2012.  this is the first film in Assamese language to be invited to the Producer Lab, Rotterdam. Among the 23 projects in Goa Film Bazaar, only 4 projects were invited to the lab and ‘The Bicycle’ is the first project for that. Besides that, ‘Chor’ was also invited to Video Library Selection organized by 32nd Guadalajara International Film Festival 2017 in Mexico, the most prestigious film festival in Latin America, and also got the official selection in the Competitive Panorama section at the 10th International Children's Film Festival, Bangladesh 2017.

References

External links
 

2011 films
2010s Assamese-language films